is an autobahn in western Germany. It starts at the Dutch-German border near the community of Niederkrüchten, district of Viersen. From Elmpt it runs northeast.

Its westernmost part serves as an important commuter route into Düsseldorf. The autobahn becomes Bundesstraße 7 shortly before the Rheinkniebrücke, which leads into the Düsseldorf city centre. Traffic of the A 52 is routed through the Düsseldorf city centre on the B 8 and B 1 secondary roads up to Düsseldorf-Mörsenbroich, where the A 52 becomes a road of its own again.

The autobahn has three parts:
Dutch-German border - Niederkrüchten-Elmpt - Mönchengladbach - Düsseldorf-Heerdt
Düsseldorf-Mörsenbroich - Dreieck Essen-Ost
Gladbeck - Gelsenkirchen - Marl-Nord

A new connection from the Dutch border to Elmpt opened in May 2009. An extension connecting the interchange Essen-Ost with the interchange Gladbeck has been proposed for several years, but has not been built yet, due to the need for several kilometers of tunnels below densely populated areas.

Exit list 

|colspan="2"|
| From interchange Roermond  (NL)
|-
|colspan="2" style="text-align:center;"| N280
|Netherlands
|-
|colspan="3"|

 

|-
|colspan="3"|

 
|-
|colspan="3"|

 

 

 

 

|-
|colspan="3"|

  interrupted (further need)
|-
|colspan="3"|

 

 

 Haltern

References

External links 
 

52
A052